Khan Uul (khan mountain) is one of nine Düüregs (districts) of the Mongolian capital of Ulaanbaatar. It is subdivided into 14 Khoroos (subdistricts).

Khan Uul is located in the south, at the foot of one of the four mountains of Ulaanbaatar, the Bogd Khan Uul.

References

External links
Official site (Mongolian)

Districts of Ulaanbaatar